The Mead Johnson River-Rail-Truck Terminal and Warehouse is a historic terminal / warehouse at the Port of Evansville in Evansville, Indiana.  The complex was built in 1931 and consists of the terminal building and warehouse.  The terminal building is a rectangular canopied structure measuring 285 feet long, 110 feet wide, and 62 feet high. The building is cantilevered 45 feet over the Ohio River. The terminal is serviced by two electric cranes that each measure 54 feet long. The original warehouse is 585 feet long and 150 feet wide.  It was enlarged by a 310-foot addition in 1957.  The terminal is operated by Kinder Morgan and is served by CSX Transportation.

It was added to the National Register of Historic Places in 1984.

References

Buildings and structures in Evansville, Indiana
Railway buildings and structures in Indiana
Trucking industry in the United States
Transport infrastructure completed in 1931
National Register of Historic Places in Evansville, Indiana
Industrial buildings and structures on the National Register of Historic Places in Indiana
Railway buildings and structures on the National Register of Historic Places in Indiana
Warehouses on the National Register of Historic Places
CSX Transportation
Kinder Morgan
Transportation buildings and structures in Vanderburgh County, Indiana